Ferran Pol Pérez (born 28 February 1983) is an Andorran former international footballer who last played for UE Santa Coloma, as a goalkeeper.

International career
Pol made his senior international debut on 2 June 2010 in a 1-0 friendly defeat to Albania.

References

External links

1983 births
Living people
Andorran footballers
Andorra international footballers
Association football goalkeepers
UE Vilassar de Mar players
UA Horta players
CD Masnou players
UDA Gramenet footballers
UE Sants players
FC Andorra players
FC Lusitanos players
UE Sant Julià players
UE Santa Coloma players